The Brahma Diamond is a 1909 American silent short drama film directed by D. W. Griffith.

Cast
 Harry Solter as A Tourist
 George Gebhardt as A Guard
 Florence Lawrence as The Guard's Sweetheart
 David Miles as The Guard's Sweetheart's Father
 Charles Inslee as An Unscrupulous Hindu
 Arthur V. Johnson as Executioner
 John R. Cumpson as Tourist
 Edward Dillon
 Robert Harron as Native Servant
 Anita Hendrie as Tourist
 Marion Leonard as Dancer (unconfirmed)
 Owen Moore
 Barry O'Moore as Tourist (as Herbert Yost)
 Mack Sennett as A Guard / A Servant / Hotel Manager
 Dorothy West as Tourist

References

External links
 

1909 films
1909 drama films
Silent American drama films
American silent short films
American black-and-white films
Films directed by D. W. Griffith
1909 short films
1900s American films